Observatory is the second studio album by husband and wife duo Steve Weingart & Renee Jones. Co-produced by Steve Weingart and Simon Phillips, the CD was released worldwide on November 27, 2012 by Skeewa Music.

Track listing
 "Twenty Twelve" (Weingart) – 5:15
 "Time Will Tell" (Weingart & Jones) – 6:49
 "Conspiracy" (Weingart) – 5:21
 "Ethos" (Weingart & Jones) – 5:28
 "Nostalgia" (Weingart) – 4:32
 "Echoplexity" (Weingart & Jones) – 8:55
 "Shelter" (Weingart) – 6:27
 "After" (Weingart) – 6:37

Personnel
 Steve Weingart – Piano, Keyboards, Vocals
 Renee Jones – Electric Bass, Vocals
 Simon Phillips – Drums (except After)
  Katisse Buckingham - Saxes & Flutes
 Chris Wabich - Percussion, Drums on After, Steel Drums on Shelter
 Mike Miller - Electric Guitar on Twenty Twelve

References

External links
 The Official Website of Steve Weingart & Renee Jones

2012 albums
Steve Weingart albums